Sij (also Romanized as Sīj) is a village in Kardeh Rural District, in the Central District of Mashhad County, Razavi Khorasan Province, Iran. At the 2006 census, its population was 679, in 161 families.

References 

Populated places in Mashhad County